Ľuboš Nosický (born 4 September 1967) is a former Slovak football player and former manager of FK AS Trenčín.

He played football for FK Drnovice making 34 appearances for the club in the Czech league.

References

1967 births
Living people
Czechoslovak footballers
Slovak football managers
FK Drnovice players
FC Spartak Trnava managers
MŠK Žilina managers
AS Trenčín managers
Slovak Super Liga managers
Czech First League players
FK Dubnica managers
Slovakia national under-21 football team managers
People from Ilava District
Sportspeople from the Trenčín Region
Association football midfielders
Association football defenders